St. Croix Stream is an  river in Aroostook County, Maine. From the outflow of St. Croix Lake in St. Croix Township (Township 8, Range 4, WELS), the river runs northwest to the Aroostook River in Masardis. Via the Aroostook River, St. Croix Stream is part of the Saint John River watershed.

See also
List of rivers of Maine

References

Maine Streamflow Data from the USGS
Maine Watershed Data From Environmental Protection Agency

Tributaries of the Saint John River (Bay of Fundy)
Rivers of Aroostook County, Maine